Hong Thi Tran (born May 5, 1966) was a candidate in the Washington Democratic Party primary election for the United States Senate in 2006, challenging incumbent Maria Cantwell.  Tran received more than five percent of the Democratic vote, and her differing views from those of Maria Cantwell (on the Iraq War in particular) drew the attention of the news media and local progressives.  Tran is the first Vietnamese American in the state to run for U.S. Senate, and possibly the first in the country to do so, according to Carol Vu of the Northwest Asian Weekly, who considered Tran's campaign to be "historic."

Biography
Tran's family lived in Ho Chi Minh City, Vietnam from her birth until they fled the country during the fall of Saigon to the Viet Cong forces in the spring of 1975, when she was almost eight years old.  They escaped on a boat, then were picked up by a US Navy vessel.  They were moved through various refugee camps, eventually making it to the United States, and settling in Orlando, Florida.

Tran earned a Bachelor of Arts from Agnes Scott College in Decatur, Georgia, in 1988. After taking a year off to earn money for tuition, she attended law school at the University of Utah College of Law, receiving her Juris Doctor in 1992.  Tran's start in the non-profit legal services field started during law school, when she began volunteering at Utah Legal Services, a nonprofit agency providing free civil legal services to low-income families. There she specialized in payday loans, fair debt collection, unemployment compensation, child custody, and domestic violence issues.

After graduation, she decided to continue providing legal services to the underprivileged and received a fellowship to work at Legal Services of North Carolina.  After her fellowship, she moved to Spokane Legal Services where she specialized in child custody cases involving abusive relationships for a year. In 1996, she began working at the Northwest Justice Project in Seattle.  The next 10 years were at the Northwest Justice Project; the first eight were as a Staff Attorney working on advocacy for affordable housing and individuals facing housing discrimination or eviction, including co-authoring briefs submitted to the U.S. Supreme Court.  Between 2004 and 2006, when she resigned her position to campaign, she was an Advocacy Coordinator, mentoring new attorneys and supporting other advocates at her organization.

2006 election

Tran, according to her campaign website and media interviews, entered the race for the Democratic nomination for US Senate due to her opposition to the presence of US troops in Iraq, free trade agreements NAFTA and CAFTA, and the USA PATRIOT Act, all of which incumbent Senator Maria Cantwell had voted in favor of.  Tran had previously considered entering the Democratic primary to challenge Rep. Jim McDermott (D-Seattle), who she considered insufficiently strong on poverty issues.  After Mark Wilson, a fellow anti-Iraq War candidate, dropped out of the primary, endorsed Cantwell, and accepted a position on her campaign staff as "outreach coordinator" with a salary of $8,000 per month, Tran's campaign began receiving more attention, as she was the only anti-war Democratic candidate left in the primary at that time. One day later, Tran was contacted by Dal LaMagna (a progressive activist and organizer who himself had been hired by the Cantwell campaign the day before Wilson) about joining the Cantwell campaign. Based on the context of the call, Tran interpreted this to be a job offer, which she declined. These events caused political commentators, like those in the Seattle Post-Intelligencer and The Washington Times, to surmise that this was an attempt by the Cantwell campaign to silence the anti-Iraq War opposition in her party.

In an interview with KUOW, a Seattle NPR affiliate, Tran noted Cantwell's avoidance of debates and challenged Cantwell to debate with her. Tran criticized Cantwell for not being the most electable Democratic candidate because she believed Cantwell had divided the party.  Tran speculated that Cantwell had alienated the progressive portion of the state to the extent that many would either stay home or vote for a third party candidate during the general election. Despite Tran's harsh criticism of Senator Cantwell, Tran said that if she lost, she would vote for the Democratic nominee in the general election because she wanted her "vote to count". In the September 19 edition of The Washington Times, Tran was quoted as saying that if she lost in the primary she would "certainly not" endorse Cantwell.

Both media reports and Tran's campaign press releases highlighted the lack of support provided to Tran by the state Democratic party leadership, such as restricting her access to the party's voter database and refusing to let her bring campaign signs into a Coordinated Campaign event at Whittier Elementary.  Tran claimed that the party leadership was preventing the distribution of information about her campaign to Democratic voters and PCOs in an attempt to control the primary results; party chair Dwight Pelz and spokesman Kelly Steele claimed that her campaign didn't have enough resources to utilize the information in the voter database. Despite these differences with the party leadership, Tran was able to win the sole endorsement of Cantwell's home district, the 32nd Legislative District, and shared endorsements with Cantwell in three other legislative districts, the 40th, 25th, and 26th LDs.

Tran also stated the following positions on her campaign website:  	 
 Health care: Tran supports single-payer universal health care for the U.S. 	
 Social security: Tran opposes increasing retirement age past the current age of 67. She also opposes benefit reductions and privatization of Social security. 	
 Education: Tran opposes taxpayer-funded school voucher programs. She is in favor of increased funding for education and reduction in class size. 	
 Immigration: Tran is opposed to criminalization of illegal immigrants and is opposed to guest-worker programs. 	
 Environment: Tran supports toughening environmental laws. 	
 Gay marriage: Tran supports marriage equality. 	
 Abortion: Tran is pro-choice.

2012 Judicial Election
In 2012, Tran became a candidate for King County Superior Court Judge, Department 29, running against senior deputy prosecutor  Sean O'Donnell. A controversy arose over the King County Bar Association's rating of Tran as "not qualified" despite her experience in legal work; several state and local judges questioned the accuracy of the rating. In the August 7th primary election, Tran lost with 23.11% of the vote against O'Donnell's share of 76.89% of the vote.

References

American women of Vietnamese descent in politics
1966 births
Living people
Washington (state) lawyers
Washington (state) Democrats
American anti–Iraq War activists
Vietnamese emigrants to the United States
Agnes Scott College alumni
University of Utah alumni
21st-century American women